The 1971–72 season was Clydebank's sixth season in the Scottish Football League. They competed in the Scottish League Division Two where they finished 9th in the table, Scottish League Cup where they reached the quarter-finals and Scottish Cup.

Results

Division 2

Final League table

Scottish League Cup

Group 5

Group 5 Final Table

Knockout stage

Scottish Cup

References

 

Clydebank
Clydebank F.C. (1965) seasons